Mukhtar Sahota is a British Punjabi music composer and producer, associated with the group Sahotas.

After the 2004 tsunami in Asia and the 2005 Kashmir earthquake, Sahota produced the charity single "We Can Make it Better". A R Rahman arranged the strings.

Sahota releases his music via his own label, Internalmusic.

Sahota has produced songs for a number of Bollywood films.

Albums produced by Mukhtar Sahota for Sahotas

Solo albums & singles produced by Mukhtar Sahota

Films

Various musical projects
 Rock in the Temple - Collaboration with Des Sherwood 
 Stage 3 - Ministry of Sound 2003 Compilation Album
 Ilahi - Religious Islamic Nasheed Album 2009 for Suhail Najmi

References

External links
 Mukhtar Sahota Website

Year of birth missing (living people)
Living people
British rock musicians
British composers
Bhangra (music)
British film score composers
English film score composers
English male film score composers
Experimental composers
Hindi film score composers
Punjabi people
20th-century English composers
20th-century Indian musicians
20th-century British male musicians